Everything You Want may refer to:

Everything You Want (film), a 2005 film aired on ABC Family
Everything You Want (Ray J album)
"Everything You Want" (Ray J song)
Everything You Want (Vertical Horizon album)
"Everything You Want" (Vertical Horizon song)